Frank Lawson Robinson (born January 11, 1969) is a former American football cornerback who played two seasons in the National Football League, for the Cincinnati Bengals and Denver Broncos. He also played for the Scottish Claymores in NFL Europe.

References

1969 births
Denver Broncos players
Living people
Cincinnati Bengals players
American football cornerbacks
Boise State Broncos football players
Players of American football from Newark, New Jersey